Christian Berger (born 13 January 1945) is an Austrian cinematographer. His 1985 film Raffl was entered into the 14th Moscow International Film Festival. He is mostly known for his work with Michael Haneke. In February 2010, Berger was nominated for an Academy Award for Best Cinematography for his work on The White Ribbon at the 82nd Academy Awards. He also won the ASC Award for Best Cinematography for the same film.

Berger invented the Cine Reflect Lighting System which he used on his latest films. Besides his work as director of photography he also teaches cinematography at the Vienna Film Academy.

Berger is married to actress Marika Green, and is thus the uncle of Eva Green.

Filmography
Feature films
 Raffl (1984)
 Benny's Video (1992)
 71 Fragments of a Chronology of Chance (1994)
 The Piano Teacher (2001)
 Ne fais pas ça! (2004)
 Caché (2005)
 Disengagement (2007)
 The White Ribbon (2009)
 Ludwig II (2012)
 The Notebook (2013)
 By the Sea (2015)
 Night of a 1000 Hours (2016)
 Happy End (2017)

See also
 List of German-speaking Academy Award winners and nominees

References

External links 
 
 
 Gerry Guida Light Is Invisible. We Only See the Light Reflected from the World. Conversation with Christian Berger Artdigiland

1945 births
Austrian cinematographers
Living people
Film people from Innsbruck